Mala Ilomska is very short (around 2 km) right  tributary of  Ilomska – one of right tributaries of  Ugar − in Central  Bosnia, Bosnia and Herzegovina, Skender Vakuf Municipality.

This small river is formed from seven springs and streams at the Petrovo field, on the southwestern slopes of the hill Omarike (1243 m). The min  source is at an altitude of about 1230 m, and one of the registered is Bijeljino spring, near the hamlet of Nikodinovići. In addition to these, there are no significant tributaries.

See also
Petrovo Polje village

References

Rivers of Bosnia and Herzegovina